Hollenstedt is a Samtgemeinde ("collective municipality") in the district of Harburg, in Lower Saxony, Germany. Its seat is in the village Hollenstedt.  

The Samtgemeinde Hollenstedt consists of the following municipalities:

 Appel 
 Drestedt 
 Halvesbostel 
 Hollenstedt
 Moisburg 
 Regesbostel 
 Wenzendorf 

Samtgemeinden in Lower Saxony